Saint Tarasios (also Saint Tarasius; ; c. 730 – 25 February 806) was the Ecumenical Patriarch of Constantinople from 25 December 784 until his death on 25 February 806.

Background
Tarasios was born and raised in the city of Constantinople. A son of a high-ranking judge, Tarasios was related to important families, including that of the later Patriarch Photios the Great. Tarasios had embarked on a career in the secular administration and had attained the rank of senator, eventually becoming imperial secretary (asekretis) to the Emperor Constantine VI and his mother, the Empress Irene. Originally he embraced Iconoclasm, but later repented, resigned his post, and retired to a monastery, taking the Great Schema (monastic habit).

Since he exhibited both Iconodule sympathies and the willingness to follow imperial commands when they were not contrary to the faith, he was selected as Patriarch of Constantinople by the Empress Irene in 784, even though he was a layman at the time. Nevertheless, like all educated Byzantines, he was well versed in theology, and the election of qualified laymen as bishops was not unheard of in the history of the Church.

He reluctantly accepted, on condition that church unity would be restored with Rome and the oriental Patriarchs. To make him eligible for the office of patriarch, Tarasios was duly ordained to the deaconate and then the priesthood, prior to his consecration as bishop.

Seventh Ecumenical Council

Before accepting the dignity of Patriarch, Tarasios had demanded and obtained the promise that the veneration of icons would be restored in the church. As a part of his policy of improving relations with Rome, he persuaded Empress Irene to write to Pope Hadrian I, inviting him to send delegates to Constantinople for a new council, to repudiate heresy. The Pope agreed to send delegates, although he disapproved of the appointment of a layman to the patriarchate. The council convened in the Church of the Holy Apostles on 17 August 786. Mutinous troops burst into the church and dispersed the delegates. The shaken papal legates at once took ship for Rome. The mutinous troops were removed from the city, and the legates reassembled at Nicaea in September 787. The Patriarch served as acting chairman (Christ was considered the true chairman). The council, known as the Second Council of Nicaea, condemned Iconoclasm and formally approved the veneration of icons. The patriarch assumed a moderate policy towards former Iconoclasts, which incurred the opposition of Theodore the Studite and his partisans.

Divorce of Constantine VI

About a decade later, Tarasios became involved in a new controversy. In January 795, Emperor Constantine VI divorced his wife, Maria of Amnia, and Tarasios reluctantly condoned the divorce. The monks were scandalised by the patriarch's consent. The leaders of the protest, Abbot Plato of Sakkoudion and his nephew Theodore the Studite, were exiled, but the uproar continued. Much of the anger was directed at Tarasios for allowing the subsequent marriage of the emperor to Theodote to take place, although he had refused to officiate. Under severe pressure from Theodore, Tarasios excommunicated the priest who had conducted Constantine's second marriage.

End of Patriarchate
Tarasios continued to loyally serve the subsequent imperial regimes of Irene and Nikephoros I. The patriarch's reputation suffered from criticism of his alleged tolerance of simony. On the other hand, his pliability proved most welcome to three very different monarchs and accounts for Tarasios' continuation in office until his death. The later selections of the laymen Nikephoros and Photios as patriarchs may have been in part inspired by the example set by Tarasios.

Sainthood
Though some later scholars have been critical of what they perceive as Tarasios' weakness before imperial power, he continues to be revered in the Eastern Orthodox Churches for his defence of the use of icons, and his struggle for the peace and unity of the Church. His feast day is celebrated on February 25 by the Eastern Orthodox and Byzantine-rite Catholic churches and on February 18 by Roman-rite Catholics. (This date on the Julian Calendar at present corresponds to March 10 on the Gregorian Calendar).

See also
 Saint Tarasios of Constantinople, patron saint archive

References

Bibliography
The Oxford Dictionary of Byzantium, Oxford University Press, 1991.
The Oxford Dictionary of the Christian Church, third edition
Byzantium: the Early Centuries by John Julius Norwich, 1988.

External links
St Tarasius the Archbishop of Constantinople Orthodox icon and synaxarion

730 births
806 deaths
Saints from Constantinople
8th-century patriarchs of Constantinople
9th-century patriarchs of Constantinople
9th-century Christian saints